"Party People" is a song by the band Parliament from their 1979 album Gloryhallastoopid. Over ten minutes long, it was released as both a two-part 7" single and a 12" record. It reached #39 on the Billboard R&B chart. Stylistically "Party People" is in more of a disco vein than the funk songs for which Parliament is best known. According to music writer Rickey Vincent it was the band's "self-admitted worst record ever."

References

Parliament (band) songs
1979 singles
Songs written by George Clinton (funk musician)
Casablanca Records singles
Songs written by Bootsy Collins
Songs written by Garry Shider
Songs about parties
1979 songs